Rafik Guitane (born 26 May 1999) is a French professional footballer who plays as a midfielder for Portuguese club Estoril on loan from Reims.

Career

Le Havre
Guitane signed his first professional contract with Le Havre on 21 July 2016 at the age of 17. Guitane made his professional debut with Le Havre in a 4–0 Coupe de France win over Saint-Colomban Locminé on 4 December 2016. He made his league debut on 19 September 2017 in a 1–0 home win against FC Sochaux-Montbéliard. His first professional goal came on 25 November, two minutes after coming off the bench in the 71st minute of a league game against Lens. Cutting inside from the right, Guitane fired a shot past opposing goalkeeper Jérémy Vachoux to secure a 1–0 victory.

Rennes
On 1 February 2018, Guitane was sold to Rennes for €10 million. He however spent the rest of the season on loan with Le Havre.

His first full season with Rennes, the 2018–19 season, was spoiled by injury, as he tore his anterior cruciate ligament in October 2018. 

He returned to action in the 2019–20 season, and made his competitive debut for the club on 20 October 2019 in a 3–2 away loss to Monaco, coming off the bench for Hamari Traoré in the 88th minute. On 7 November, Guitane made his UEFA Europa League debut as a late substitute for Benjamin Bourigeaud in a 1–0 loss to CFR Cluj. He finished the season with four total appearances, as he struggled to find playing time.

Loan to Marítimo
On 12 August 2020, Guitane was sent on a one-season loan to Primeira Liga club Marítimo. He made his debut for the club on 20 September against Santa Clara, coming on as an 85th-minute substitute for Pedro Pelágio. He eventually managed to assert himself as a starter in the team, making 30 total appearances that season, as Marítimo finished 15th – just above the relegation spots.

Reims
On 30 August 2021, Guitane signed a permanent contract with Reims. He would, however, continue on loan with Marítimo for his second successive season.

Loan to Estoril
On 31 January 2023, Guitane returned to Portugal and joined Estoril on loan until the end of the 2022–23 season.

Personal life
Guitane was born in France to an Algerian father and a Moroccan mother, and has represented France at youth international level.

Career statistics

Club

References

External links

Rafik Guitane at HAC Foot

1999 births
Sportspeople from Évreux
Footballers from Normandy
French sportspeople of Algerian descent
French sportspeople of Moroccan descent
Living people
Association football midfielders
French footballers
France youth international footballers
Le Havre AC players
Stade Rennais F.C. players
C.S. Marítimo players
Stade de Reims players
G.D. Estoril Praia players
Ligue 1 players
Ligue 2 players
Championnat National 2 players
Championnat National 3 players
Primeira Liga players
French expatriate footballers
Expatriate footballers in Portugal
French expatriate sportspeople in Portugal